Horodok Raion was a raion in Lviv Oblast in western Ukraine. Its administrative center was the city of Horodok. The area of the district is 727 km. It bordered with Yavoriv, Pustomyty, Mykolaiv, Drohobych, Sambir, and Mostyska raions. The raion was abolished on 18 July 2020 as part of the administrative reform of Ukraine, which reduced the number of raions of Lviv Oblast to seven. The area of Horodok Raion was merged into newly established Lviv Raion.

It was established in 1939.

At the time of disestablishment, the raion consisted of three hromadas:
 Horodok urban hromada with the administration in Horodok;
 Komarno urban hromada with the administration in the city of Komarno;
 Velykyi Liubin settlement hromada with the administration in the urban-type settlement of Velykyi Liubin.

References

External links
 gorodok-vlada.gov.ua 

Former raions of Lviv Oblast
1939 establishments in Ukraine
Ukrainian raions abolished during the 2020 administrative reform